Skull Creek may refer to:

Australia
 Skull Creek (Northern Territory), a tributary of the Robinson River near Borroloola, Northern Territory
 Skull Creek (Queensland), a tributary of Saline Creek near Woorabinda, Queensland
 Skull Creek (Victoria), a tributary of the Mitchell River near the village of Lindenow, Victoria
 Skull Creek (Western Australia), a tributary of Lake Mason near the village of Sandstone in the Mid West, Western Australia

United States
 Skull Creek (Beaufort County, South Carolina), a historic site
 Skull Creek Township, Butler County, Nebraska

See also 
 Skull Creek massacre, massacre of Karankawa people in Mexican Texas in February 1823